Infinity is a 1996 American biographical drama film about the romantic life of physicist Richard Feynman. Feynman was played by Matthew Broderick, who also directed and co-produced the film. Broderick's mother, Patricia Broderick, wrote the screenplay, which was based on the books Surely You're Joking, Mr. Feynman! and What Do You Care What Other People Think?, both written by Feynman and Ralph Leighton. It is the only film Broderick has ever directed.

Plot
The film follows the book What Do You Care What Other People Think? fairly closely in terms of the stories told.

The film starts in 1924 with Richard and his father Melville walking through the woods where Melville shows his scientific inspiration for Richard.
In 1934, Richard and Arline are in high school and their romantic relationship starts.
The story then jumps to his college years and Arline getting sick with lymphatic tuberculosis.
It continues to his move west to Los Alamos National Laboratory in Los Alamos, New Mexico, where Arline follows him later to a hospital in Albuquerque, New Mexico, where she dies.
The film ends with Feynman crying at the sight of the red dress Arline had pointed out.

Cast

Production
In 1994, Broderick said of the project, "The obvious way to structure a film about Feynman would be to open with the Challenger disaster: The crazy old genius comes along and figures everything out, then he drifts into a reverie along the lines of 'A long time ago I met a girl.. . .' We didn't do that, because we want this to be an intimate movie and thought focusing on one period of his life that includes the invention of the bomb and the death of his first wife was enough."

Broderick later said in 1997, "It was a difficult job and took four years from start to finish."

Reception
The film has a 62% rating on Rotten Tomatoes. Roger Ebert awarded the film three stars.  Leonard Maltin awarded it two and a half stars.

Emanuel Levy of Variety gave the film a negative review and described the film as "a flawed movie that suffers from a weak performance by Patricia Arquette."  On the other hand, John Krewson of The A.V. Club gave it a positive review and wrote that "saps, scientific or otherwise, will enjoy it."

References

External links 
<div class="references">

1996 romantic drama films
1996 films
American biographical drama films
American romantic drama films
Biographical films about scientists
Films directed by Matthew Broderick
Films shot in New Mexico
Films shot in New Jersey
Richard Feynman
Films about the Manhattan Project
Films scored by Bruce Broughton
1996 directorial debut films
1996 drama films
Films produced by Joel Soisson
1990s English-language films
1990s American films
Films about disability